Devil is the fourth album by Lydia. It was released on March 19, 2013.

History
On January 29, 2013, the band released the album art, release date, and the first single off the album.

The band released a deluxe edition of the album on October 15, 2013. It featured four new songs and acoustic versions of "The Exit" and "Devil".

Track listing

Charts

References

External links
Devil Preorder

2013 albums
Lydia (band) albums